Songsin Tsao is an international lawn bowler from Thailand.

Bowls career
Tsao has won two singles gold medals  at the Lawn bowls at the Southeast Asian Games.

She won a singles silver medal at the 2009 Asia Pacific Bowls Championships, held in Kuala Lumpur. Tsao was selected as part of the five woman team by Thailand for the 2012 World Outdoor Bowls Championship, which was held in Adelaide, Australia.

In 2017, she won the Hong Kong International Bowls Classic pairs title with Jintana Visanuvimol.

References

Year of birth missing (living people)
Living people
Songsin Tsao
Southeast Asian Games medalists in lawn bowls
Competitors at the 2005 Southeast Asian Games
Competitors at the 2007 Southeast Asian Games
Songsin Tsao